Our Savior Lutheran Church or Our Savior's Lutheran Church may refer to:

in Canada
Our Saviour's Lutheran Church (Prince George, British Columbia)

in the United States
Our Savior’s Kvindherred Lutheran Church (Calamus, Iowa), listed on the National Register of Historic Places (NRHP)
Our Savior Lutheran Church (Indianapolis), Indiana, NRHP-listed
Our Savior's Lutheran Church (Osage, Iowa), NRHP-listed
Our Saviour's Evangelical Lutheran Church, Manistee, Michigan, NRHP-listed
Our Saviour's Atonement Lutheran Church, Manhatten, New York, New York
Our Savior's Scandinavian Lutheran Church, Coulee, North Dakota, NRHP-listed
Our Savior's Lutheran Church (Menno, South Dakota), NRHP-listed
Our Savior's Lutheran Church (Cranfills Gap, Texas)